The 2018 Oceania Weightlifting Championships took place at the Complexe Sportif de Boulari in Le Mont-Dore, New Caledonia from 26 to 30 June 2018.

Results shown below are for the senior competition only. Junior and youth results are cited here and here respectively.

Medal tables
Ranking by Big (Total result) medals

Ranking by all medals: Big (Total result) and Small (Snatch and Clean & Jerk)

Medal summary

Men

Women

References

External links
Senior results book
Junior results book
Youth results book

Weightlifting competitions
Oceania Weightlifting Championships
Oceania Weightlifting Championships
International weightlifting competitions hosted by New Caledonia
Sports competitions in Nouméa
Oceania Weightlifting Championships